Quanyong Community is a village-level division of the Xi'an Road Subdistrict of Shahekou District, Dalian, Liaoning, China.

References

External links
泉涌社区党建网 

Dalian
Communities of China